Ian Eagle (born February 9, 1969) is an American sports announcer. He calls NBA, NFL, and college basketball games on CBS, TNT, and TBS, as well as Brooklyn Nets games on the YES Network and French Open tennis for Tennis Channel. Other announcing experiences include Army–Navy football games, boxing, and NCAA track and field for CBS.

Early life and education
Eagle was born to entertainers Jack Eagle and Monica Maris. Jack, a former "Catskills comedian" and commercial actor, was best known for portraying "Brother Dominic" and "Mr. Cholesterol" in Xerox and Fleischmann's margarine television commercials respectively in the 1970s. Maris was a singer.

Eagle graduated from Syracuse University's S. I. Newhouse School of Public Communications in 1990. He was in the Alpha Epsilon Pi fraternity.

Career

Early career
While at Syracuse, Eagle joined WJPZ his freshman year and announced women’s basketball games at the Carrier Dome. In his sophomore year, he was given more opportunities to call high-profile Syracuse Orange games on WAER, a student run radio station. He also joined UUTV (now CitrusTV), to gain on-camera experience. Outside the campus, Eagle interned with then-recent graduate Mike Tirico at WTVH in Syracuse for three years. He hosted 10 shows during his senior year.

Following his graduation in 1990, Eagle began working for WFAN Radio in New York City as a producer. In 1992, WFAN gave him his own show (Bagels and Baseball). In 1993, Eagle was given pregame and postgame duties for the Jets. 1994 saw Eagle's first year as a Nets play-by-play radio announcer. A year later, he was made a TV announcer for SportsChannel, which later became Fox Sports Net New York (now MSG Plus). In 1997, WFAN made Eagle play-by-play announcer for Jets games.

Later television and radio career
Eagle joined CBS in 1998 doing announcing work for NFL and NCAA basketball. He continues to serve these roles today. In 2010, he joined Dan Fouts to make up the number three broadcast team for CBS' NFL coverage. The pair was elevated to the number two team behind Jim Nantz and Phil Simms in the 2014 season. After Fouts parted ways with CBS, and with the NFL’s playoff expansion, which included CBS gaining rights to an extra playoff game, during the 2020 offseason, the network paired him with former Fox analyst Charles Davis, and the duo now call one of CBS’s Wild Card games in years the network has the second game, and a Divisional Game in even years. Other CBS work includes boxing, The Pilot Pen Tennis tournament, the U.S. Open (both the late night show and daytime studio host for 2008 U.S. Open coverage), and the NCAA Track and Field Championships.

Prior to joining the YES Network as Nets announcer in 2002, Ian Eagle served the same role for the Nets on the MSG Network and Fox Sports Net New York. When Marv Albert joined the YES Network prior to the 2005-06 NBA season, the games were split between the two broadcasters, before Eagle again became the primary announcer for the Nets in the 2011-12 NBA season upon Albert's departure.

During the 2010 NBA Playoffs, Eagle called two games on TNT, a likely move to promote him to calling national television broadcasts, similar to what Albert, former Minnesota Timberwolves play-by-play man Kevin Harlan and Knicks play-by-play man Mike Breen experienced. He was again called up by TNT for the 2011 NBA Playoffs, pairing with his YES colleague Mike Fratello. He has since continued to cover the NBA Playoffs for TNT through the first 2 rounds, though the amount of games fluctuates on whether the Nets make the playoffs (in 2019 and 2020, with the Nets making the playoffs, he instead covered the team locally on YES and missed the entire 1st round of TNT coverage, with Spero Dedes filling-in. He returned to cover part of the Toronto-76ers 2nd round series for TNT). He also does play-by-play for Thursday Night Football on Westwood One. On Sirius, in addition to his daily talk show, Eagle did a weekly talk show, The Phil Jackson Show, with Los Angeles Lakers coach Phil Jackson. And Eagle retains his roots to WFAN, occasionally serving as a fill-in talk show host on his old station.

Eagle also serves as the voice-over host of NBA Action replaced Spero Dedes in 2005 and previously, NBA Jam. In 2013, he called the international telecasts of the 2013 NBA Finals alongside Jim Spanarkel, his partner on Nets broadcasts on YES.

Prior to the 2019-20 NBA season, it was announced that as a replacement to the recently eliminated "Players Only" broadcasts which occurred on Tuesday nights beginning during the 2nd half of the season, TNT would instate a more traditional broadcast format to their Tuesday Night slate of games. Eagle was announced to be one of the play-by-play announcers to the weekly scheduled doubleheader, along with Brewers announcer Brian Anderson. Eagle will be partnered with either Stan Van Gundy or Jim Jackson.

In October 2022, it was announced that Eagle will succeed Jim Nantz as the lead play-by-play announcer for CBS and Turner Sports' coverage of the NCAA Tournament starting in 2024.

Since Eagle pronounces his first name "EYE-un" (instead of the more common "EE-an"), he has often admitted that life was easier prior to the 1986 release of the movie Iron Eagle. In fact, many callers (including prominent sports figures) continue to call him "Iron Eagle"—much to his chagrin.

Other announcing
French Open for Tennis Channel
Masters Online commentary of Amen corner 09
Voice of the announcer for NBA 07, 08 and 09 for PSP
NBA playoff announcing for NBA TV
 Westwood One radio play by play 1996 Atlanta Olympics 
Hosts NBA Action, a weekly highlights and features show for NBA TV
Announces preseason New York Jets telecasts on WCBS-TV in New York
Host of Nets Magazine, a look inside the New Jersey Nets for the YES Network
Voiceover for Modell's radio commercials and in-store voiceovers
Voice of NBA Action from 2004 to present
Co-hosts Power Performances presented by Courtyard by Marriott on CBS.Sportsline.com
NFL Thursday Night games on Westwood One, with Trent Green as his color man
Lee Myles Commercials
On the song Games by Dog Eat Dog
Voice of announcer on NBA Shootout video game series by 989 Sports.
Commentator and playable character on NBA Playgrounds by Saber Interactive.

Personal life
Eagle lives in Essex Fells, New Jersey, with his wife Alisa. They have two children, Noah and Erin. Noah, also a Syracuse alum, is a play-by-play announcer for college football on Fox, the Los Angeles Clippers on radio, and has held the same role for NFL coverage on Nickelodeon.

Awards
Bob Costas Award for Outstanding Sportscasting (while at Syracuse)
(2002, 2013, 2016, 2017)  New York Sports Emmy Award: On Camera Talent: Sports Play by Play 
2013: WAER Wall of Fame
2020: The Big Lead Play-by-Play Announcer of the Year

References

External links

NBA.com Profile
NBA.com Broadcaster of the Week
Syracuse Alumni Profile

1969 births
American color commentators
American radio sports announcers
American television sports announcers
Boxing commentators
Brooklyn Nets announcers
College basketball announcers in the United States
College football announcers
Jewish American sportspeople
Lacrosse announcers
Living people
National Basketball Association broadcasters
National Football League announcers
New Jersey Nets announcers
New York Jets announcers
People from Essex Fells, New Jersey
S.I. Newhouse School of Public Communications alumni
Syracuse Orange football announcers
Syracuse Orange men's basketball announcers
Tennis commentators
Track and field broadcasters
YES Network